Otto Karl Alexander Mejer (27 May 1818, Zellerfeld – 24 December 1893, Hanover) was a German canon law specialist and church historian.

He studied law at the universities of Göttingen, Berlin and Jena, receiving his doctorate at Göttingen in 1841. While a student in Berlin, he was deeply influenced by the teachings of Friedrich Carl von Savigny. Not long after graduation, he became a lecturer at Göttingen, and in 1845/46 took an extended study trip to Rome.

In 1847 he became a full professor of law at the University of Königsberg, which was followed by professorships at Greifswald (1850) and Rostock (1851). In 1874 he returned as a professor to Göttingen, where he taught classes until his retirement in 1883. From 1885 to 1893 he was president of the State Consistory at the Evangelical-Lutheran Church of Hanover, then the highest-ranking office of the church.

Principal works 
 Institutionen des gemeinen deutschen Kirchenrechtes, 1845 – Institutions of common German canon law.
 Die Propaganda, ihre Provinzen und ihr Recht. Mit besonderer Rücksicht auf Deutschland (2 volumes), 1853 – Propaganda, provinces and their rights, with a special reference to Germany.
 Eine Erinnerung an Barthold Georg Niebuhr, 1867 – In memorance of Barthold Georg Niebuhr.
 Lehrbuch des deutschen Kirchenrechts (3rd edition, 1869) – Textbook of German canon law. 
 Zur Geschichte der römisch-deutschen Frage (3 volumes), 1871-75 – History of the Roman-German question. A description involving the development of legal relations between the state and the Catholic Church within the German states.
 Febronius, Weihbischof Johann Nikolaus von Hontheim und sein Widerruf, 1880 – Johann Nikolaus von Hontheim and his revocation.
He was also the author of 14 articles in the Allgemeine Deutsche Biographie.

References 

1818 births
1893 deaths
Academic staff of the University of Rostock
Academic staff of the University of Greifswald
Academic staff of the University of Königsberg
Academic staff of the University of Göttingen
People from Goslar (district)
Historians of Christianity
Canon law jurists
German historians of religion
19th-century jurists